Valery Dudyshev  (born July 5, 1948

, Samara) is a Russian scientist. Until his retirement in 2008, he was a professor at the University of Samara, Russia . He did his PhD on the topic of non-traditional Energetics.
Born into a family of employees in Samara on the Volga in 1948, he graduated in 1971 from Kuibyshev Polytechnic Institute (currently Samara State Technical University) with honors, majoring in electrical engineering.
He went on to undertake postgraduate and doctoral courses on alternative energy and electrical engineering.  He wrote a thesis on “The autonomous power supply system of objects of special purpose” and proceeded to defend his PhD thesis in Saint Petersburg in 1978.
Notable publications of Dudyshev

 include the development of a new general electro-physical theory of natural phenomena and a patented publication on the "method for disassociating liquid" as well as other patented publications, including a patented publication on the basis of his discoveries in the physics of combustion .
In his position as head of some regional ecological programs in Russia he published diverse scientific works on ecological themes, such as the improvisation of burning processes.
After having worked for the Samara Institute from 1971 to 2008, he eventually retired .  Nowadays he is still engaged in scientific and technological areas, as well as doing consulting and social work.

References

External links
 Valery Dudyshev's homepage (Russian)
 A list of some of Dudyshev's inventions and papers (English)
 Interview (Russian)
 Works of Dudyshev at SciTecLibrary
 A list of some of Dudyshev's publications (Russian)

Russian environmentalists
1948 births
Living people
Scientists from Samara, Russia
Academic staff of Samara State University